James Glover (born 2 December 1993) is a professional rugby league footballer who plays as a  for the York Knights in the Betfred Championship.

Glover has previously played for the Dewsbury Rams and spent time on loan at the Hemel Stags in Kingstone Press League 1.

Background
Glover was born in Wakefield, West Yorkshire, England.

Career
In October 2018 Glover joined the Sheffield Eagles on a two-year deal.

After a good start to the 2019 season, Glover suffered a knee injury against Barrow Raiders which put him out of action for 9 months.

Following three seasons with the Eagles it was announced in 2021 that Glover was set to leave the club at the end of the season. In October 2021 he signed for York City Knights.

References

External links
Dewsbury Rams profile

1993 births
Living people
Dewsbury Rams players
English rugby league players
Hemel Stags players
Rugby league halfbacks
Rugby league players from Wakefield
Sheffield Eagles players
York City Knights players